Tamazula de Victoria is a small town and seat of the municipality of Tamazula in the Mexican state of Durango, near the Sierra Madre Occidental mountains. The town is located about 19 minutes of Culiacán  Sinaloa Municipality. General Guadalupe Victoria, the first president of Mexico, was born there, hence the name, as well as his brother, Francisco Victoria.  Its official name is Tamazula de Victoria. As of 2010, the town had a population of 2,337 The Tamazula River runs directly north of the town.

Villages
The municipal subdivisions of Tamazula are:

Amaculi
Los Remedios
El Chicural
El Cocoyole
Chacala
El Llano
El Comedero
Las Juntas
Las Quebradas
El Río
Pueblo Viejo
El Carrizo
Otatitlán
Las Coloradas
Santa Elena
El Cajón
La Mesa del Rodeo
El Durazno
La Alameda
Santa Gertrudis
El Tecuán
Santa Barbara
Cuesta Blanca

References

Populated places in Durango